SS Aire was a cargo steamship built for the Goole Steam Shipping Company in 1886.

History

In 1905 she was acquired by the Lancashire and Yorkshire Railway. In 1922 she was acquired by the London and North Western Railway and in 1923 by the London, Midland and Scottish Railway.

She was sent for scrapping on 4 October 1930.

References

1886 ships
Steamships of the United Kingdom
Ships built on the River Tyne
Ships of the Lancashire and Yorkshire Railway
Ships of the London and North Western Railway
Ships of the London, Midland and Scottish Railway